The Florida Azalea Festival is a two-day event held annually in Palatka, Florida, on the first weekend of March. The festival celebrates the seasonal arrival of the azalea blossom to the northeast Florida region.

History
The first official Florida Azalea Festival was held in 1938. Originating as Jaycees Day, the local chapter of the Jaycees organization transformed the event into the festival celebrated today. In the early years the festival was centered at the Ravine Gardens. As its popularity grew, most of the activities were moved to the riverfront in downtown Palatka.

The modern event is conducted by the Palatka Main Street program. The Ravine Gardens still joins in the celebration with what it calls Azalea Days. Its diverse collection and high concentration of the flower makes it a staple for those who want to get a good look at the celebrated annual blooms.

Azalea Festival events
Azalea Festival events open to the public generally include:
 The Azalea Parade, featuring floats, bands and a number of community groups
 The Azalea Festival Arts and Crafts Show at Historic Lemon Street
 The Azalea Pageant 
 Azalea Days at Ravine Gardens State Park
 Open Car Show
 Florida Azalea Amateur at the Palatka Golf Club
 Bowling Tournament

References

 REQUEST FOR PROPOSALS To Conduct the 2011 Azalea Festival archived at City of Palatka
 St. Petersburg Times archived at Google News retrieved June 4, 2011

External links
 Official website

Festivals in Florida
Palatka, Florida
Tourist attractions in Palatka, Florida
Tourist attractions in Putnam County, Florida
Flower festivals in the United States
1938 establishments in Florida
Recurring events established in 1938